Don Quixote is a 1973 Australian ballet film starring Rudolph Nureyev and Robert Helpmann.

Cast

Robert Helpmann as Don Quixote
Ray Powell as Sancho Panza
Rudolph Nureyev as Basilio
Francis Croese as Lorenzo
Lucette Aldous as Kitri/Dulcinea
Colin Peasley as Gamache
Marilyn Rowe as street dancer/queen of the Dryads
Kelvin Coe as Espada
Gailene Stock
Carolyn Rappel
Ronald Bekker
John Meehan
Rex McNeill
Rodney Smith
Joseph Janusaitis
Frederic Werner
Alan Alder
Paul Saliba
Ronald Bekker as gypsy king
Susan Dains as gypsy queen
Julie da Costa as gypsy girls
Leigh Rowley as gypsy girls
Patricia Cox as Cupid
Janet Vernon
Gary Norman

Production
The ballet had been added to the repertoire of the Australian Ballet in 1970 and was one of Nureyev's most popular parts. Finance to film it was raised mostly in the US with most of the crew coming from Australia but a British cinematographer was used. It was shot over four weeks starting 13 November 1972 in a converted airport hangar in Essendon. They used a soundtrack which had been pre-recorded a month earlier.

Release
The film was screened around the world and was well received. However it dropped out of circulation for 25 years and has only recently been revived.

References

External links
Don Quixote at The New York Times

Don Quixote at Oz Movies

1973 films
1970s musical films
Australian musical films
Ballet films
Films based on Don Quixote
1970s English-language films
1970s Australian films